Sunday Night refers to television shows:

 Sunday Night (Australian TV program), an Australian news and current affairs program
 Sunday Night (American TV program), a late-night television show
 Sunday Night with Megyn Kelly, an American news program
 Sunday Night (South Korean TV series), a South Korean television entertainment programme
 "Sunday Night", a 2020 song by W24